Lupercio may refer to:

Lupércio, a municipality in the state of São Paulo, Brazil
Lupercio (Dungeons & Dragons), a demon lord in the Dungeons & Dragons roleplaying game
San Lupercio (Saint Lupercus), see Marcellus of Tangier